The Party for Socialism and Democracy in Niger (PSDN-Alheri) is a political party in Niger.

History
The PSDN was established on 18 May 1992. In the 1993 general elections the party received 1.5% of the vote, winning one seat in the National Assembly. It nominated Omar Katzelma Taya as its candidate for the subsequent presidential elections; he finished seventh in a field of eight candidates with 1.8% of the vote.

The early parliamentary elections in 1995 saw the party win two seats with a similar vote share. However, it boycotted the 1996 elections, which followed a coup earlier in the year.

The PSDN did not nominate a presidential candidate for the 1999 elections, and received only 0.2% of the vote in the parliamentary elections, failing to win a seat. However, after increasing its vote share to 1.3% in the 2004 general elections, it regained parliamentary representation, winning a single seat. Despite further increasing its vote share to 2.3% in the 2009 parliamentary elections, the party lost its seat. The 2011 elections saw its vote share collapse to 0.2%, as it remained seatless.

In the 2016 general elections it formed a joint list with the Nigerien Movement for Democratic Renewal to run for the National Assembly, with the alliance winning six seats.

References

1992 establishments in Niger
Political parties established in 1992
Political parties in Niger
Social democratic parties in Africa
Socialism in Niger